Kivalliq News is a Canadian weekly newspaper, published in Rankin Inlet, Nunavut by Northern News Services. The newspaper publishes content in both English and Inuktitut.

References

External links

Newspapers published in Nunavut
Weekly newspapers published in Canada
Publications established in 1994
1994 establishments in the Northwest Territories
Bilingual newspapers